Gaotai County is a county in Gansu Province, China, bordering Inner Mongolia to the northeast. It is under the administration of the prefecture-level city of Zhangye. Its postal code is 734300, and in 1999 its population was 155,260 people.

Administrative divisions
Gaotai County is divided to 9 towns and 1 other.
Towns

Others
 Gansu Gaotai Industrial Park

Climate

See also
 List of administrative divisions of Gansu

References

Gaotai County
Zhangye